Sunnyside Hospital (1863–1999) was the first mental asylum to be built in Christchurch, New Zealand. It was initially known as Sunnyside Lunatic Asylum, and its first patients were 17 people who had previously been kept in the Lyttelton gaol. In 2007, Hilmorton Hospital is just one of the mental health services that are based on the old Sunnyside Hospital grounds.

Architecture
Sunnyside was primarily designed by the New Zealand Victorian Gothic architect, Benjamin Mountfort, with an administration building designed by John Campbell. Some of the buildings were built by Daniel Reese.

Staff
Edward Seager was the first superintendent of Sunnyside Hospital. He had previously been superintendent of Lyttelton Gaol. Seager's wife, Esther Seager, had been matron of the gaol. She was appointed matron at Sunnyside in 1863.

In 1995, four years before the hospital's closure, nurses walked off the job because of dangerous working conditions.

Chatham Cup
A football team largely made up of staff from the hospital, was the first Christchurch champions of the Chatham Cup in 1926.

Notable patients
 Rita Angus (1950), artist
 Janet Frame, writer. Frame described some of her experiences in Sunnyside Hospital in her autobiography An Angel at My Table, and her novel Faces in the Water.
 [Mrs R. said it would] be a good idea for me to admit myself as a voluntary boarder to Sunnyside Mental Hospital where there was a new electric treatment, which, in her opinion, would help me. . . . I woke toothless and was admitted to Sunnyside Hospital and I was given the new electric treatment, and suddenly my life was thrown out of focus. I could not remember. I was terrified. 

 Mabel Howard ( – 23 June 1972), union worker, politician, and New Zealand's first woman cabinet minister.
 Richard Pearse (June 1951 – July 1953), inventor and aviator. Pearce flight-tested aircraft in New Zealand from 1902, and is reputed to have successfully flown on about 31 March 1903.

Footnotes

References
 Blake-Palmer, Geoffrey. 1966. 'Hospitals, Mental', In A. H. McLintock, ed., An Encyclopaedia of New Zealand. (Accessed 19 August 2007)
Christchurch City Libraries, Heritage, (accessed 19 Aug 2007)
 Frame, Janet. 1991. An Autobiography. To the Island. An Angel At My Table. The Envoy from Mirror City. New York: George Braziller.
 Frame, Janet. 1961. Reprinted in 1980. Faces in the Water. London: The Women's Press.

External links
 

Hospital buildings completed in 1863
Heritage New Zealand Category 1 historic places in Canterbury, New Zealand
Psychiatric hospitals in New Zealand
Hospitals established in 1863
1999 disestablishments in New Zealand
Defunct hospitals in New Zealand
Benjamin Mountfort buildings
1860s architecture in New Zealand